Proeulia vanderwolfi is a species of moth of the family Tortricidae. It is found in Chile's O'Higgins Region.

The wingspan is 20 mm. The ground colour of the forewings is ferruginous cream.

Etymology
The species is named in honour of Mr. Hugo van der Wolf.

References

Moths described in 2010
Proeulia
Moths of South America
Taxa named by Józef Razowski
Endemic fauna of Chile